Geoff Crowther (15 March 1944 – 13 April 2021) was a British travel writer who wrote for BIT and Lonely Planet.

Life

Early life
Crowther was born on 15 March 1944 in Halifax, West Yorkshire. His parents worked in a cotton mill.

He attended Calder High School, and began hitchhiking around Europe while still a teenager. At the University of Liverpool, he studied biochemistry, and considered staying on to undertake a doctorate, but in the end his desire to travel proved too great.

BIT and Lonely Planet
In 1972, he joined the alternative information service BIT, where he oversaw the production of Overland to India and Australia. The guide impressed Tony and Maureen Wheeler, and in 1976 they invited him to join Lonely Planet.

Personal life
He met his first wife, Hyung Poon, whilst working on a guidebook in South Korea. They married in Seoul in 1982, and their son, Ashley, was born in 1989. After their marriage ended in 2000, Crowther had a brief second marriage to a woman he met in Kenya, but this also ended in divorce.

Final years
In 2005, he sustained a head injury in an accident and moved to a residential care facility. He died in South East Queensland on 13 April 2021, at the age of seventy-seven, as a result of complications arising from dementia.

Notable guidebooks
Africa on the Cheap (1977) 
South America on a Shoestring (1980) 
India: A Travel Survival Kit (1981) 
Malaysia, Singapore & Brunei: A Travel Survival Kit (1982) 
Korea & Taiwan: A Travel Survival Kit (1982) 
Africa on a Shoestring (1983) 
East Africa: A Travel Survival Kit (1987) 
Morocco, Algeria & Tunisia: A Travel Survival Kit (1989) 
Kenya: A Travel Survival Kit (1991)

References

External links
Interview with Ashley Crowther in 2021, in which he talks about his father.

1944 births
2021 deaths
20th-century travel writers
21st-century travel writers
Alumni of the University of Liverpool
British travel writers
People from West Yorkshire